The 2016–17 BYU Cougars men's basketball team represented Brigham Young University in the 2016–17 NCAA Division I men's basketball season. It was head coach Dave Rose's twelfth season at BYU and the Cougars sixth season in the West Coast Conference. The Cougars played their home games at the Marriott Center in Provo, Utah. They finished the season 22–12, 12–6 in WCC play to finish in third place. They defeated Loyola Marymount in the quarterfinals of the WCC tournament to advance to the semifinals where they lost to Saint Mary's. They were invited to the National Invitation Tournament where they lost in the first round to Texas–Arlington.

As a result of a scandal surrounding inappropriate benefits received by BYU starting guard Nick Emery from a BYU booster, the NCAA vacated all of BYU's wins for the 2015–16 and 2016-17 seasons with the exception of a 2015 win over Weber State in which Nick Emery did not play.

Before the season

Departures

Incoming Transfers

Recruiting

Recruiting Class of 2016

Recruiting class of 2017

2016–17 returned missionaries
BYU debuted two returned missionaries for the 2016–17 season: Payton Dastrup and T. J. Haws.

BYU also saw the return of one familiar face who came to school for one season before serving his mission: Eric Mika.

2016–17 media

Nu Skin Cougar IMG Sports Network

KSL 102.7 FM and 1160 AM- Flagship Station (Salt Lake City/ Provo, UT and ksl.com)
BYU Radio- Nationwide (Dish Network 980, Sirius XM 143, and byuradio.org)
KTHK- Blackfoot/ Idaho Falls/ Pocatello/ Rexburg, ID
KMGR- Manti, UT
KSUB- Cedar City, UT
KDXU- St. George, UT

Roster
(Subject to change)

Schedule
 * Next to a score indicates a win that was forfeited due to NCAA-imposed sanctions.

|-
!colspan=8 style=| Exhibition

|-
!colspan=8 style=| Non-Conference Regular Season

|-
!colspan=8 style=| WCC Regular Season

|-
!colspan=8 style="background:#002654;"| WCC Tournament

|-
!colspan=8 style="background:#002654;"| NIT

Game summaries

Papa John's Cougar Tipoff
Broadcasters: Spencer Linton & Jarom Jordan
Starting Lineups: 
BYU White: Nick Emery, Kyle Davis, Yolei Childs, Davin Guinn, TJ Haws
BYU Blue: Zach Frampton, Colby Leifson, Steven Beo, Payton Dastrup, Jamal Aytes

Exhibition: Seattle Pacific
Broadcasters: Dave McCann, Blaine Fowler, & Spencer Linton
Starting Lineups:
Seattle Pacific: Coleman Wooten, Sam Simpson, Will Parker, Joe Rasmussen, Olivier-Paul Betu
BYU: Nick Emery, Eric Mika, Kyle Davis, Davin Guinn, TJ Haws

Exhibition: BYU–Hawai'i
Broadcasters: Dave McCann, Blaine Fowler & Spencer Linton
Starting Lineups: 
BYU-Hawaii: Tanner Nelson, Denhym Brooke, D McCleary, Gabriel Andrade, Caleb Roney
BYU: Nick Emery, L.J. Rose, Eric Mika, Kyle Davis, TJ Haws

Princeton
Broadcasters: Sam Farber & Brad Daugherty
Series History: BYU leads series 4–0
Starting Lineups:
Princeton: Amir Bell, Spencer Weisz, Henry Caruso, Steven Cook, Hans Brase
BYU: Nick Emery, L.J. Rose, Eric Mika, Kyle Davis, TJ Haws

Coppin State
Broadcasters: Dave McCann, Steve Cleveland, & Spencer Linton
Series History: First Meeting
Starting Lineups: 
Coppin State: Josh Treadwell, Blake Simpson, Keith Shivers, Joseph Gripper, Terry Harris
BYU: Nick Emery, L.J. Rose, Eric Mika, Kyle Davis, TJ Haws

Coastal Carolina
Broadcasters: Dave McCann, Blaine Fowler, & Spencer Linton
Series History: First Meeting
Starting Lineups:
Coastal Carolina: Joseph Williams-Powell, Jaylen Shaw, Elijah Wilson, Josh Coleman, Colton Ray-St Cyr
BYU: Nick Emery, L.J. Rose, Eric Mika, Kyle Davis, TJ Haws

Saint Louis
Broadcaster: Tony Cordasco
Series History: BYU leads series 3–1
Starting Lineups: 
BYU: Nick Emery, L.J. Rose, Eric Mika, Kyle Davis, TJ Haws
Saint Louis: Davell Roby, Jermaine Bishop, Mike Crawford, Elliott Welmer, Reggie Agbeko

Valparaiso
Broadcasters: Eric Rothman & Stephen Howard
Series History: Valparaiso leads series 2–1
Starting Lineups:
Valparaiso: Tevonn Walker, Shane Hammink, Lexus Williams, Jubril Adekoya, Alec Peters
BYU: Nick Emery, L.J. Rose, Eric Mika, Kyle Davis, TJ Haws

Utah Valley
Broadcaster: Robbie Bullough
Series History: BYU leads series 2–0
Starting Lineups: 
Utah Valley: Conner Toolson, Zach Nelson, Isaac Neilson, Brandon Randolph, Kenneth Ogbe
BYU: Nick Emery, L.J. Rose, Eric Mika, Kyle Davis, TJ Haws

Utah State
Broadcasters: Dave McCann, TBA, & Spencer Linton
Series History: BYU leads series 140–92
Starting Lineups:
Utah State: 
BYU:

USC
Broadcasters: Mark Neely, TBA, and TBA
Series History: USC leads series 6-3
Starting Lineups:
BYU:
USC:

References

2016-17 team
Byu
Byu
2016 in sports in Utah
2017 in sports in Utah